José Curiel (22 March 1937 – 8 January 2022) was a Venezuelan politician. A member of Copei, he served as Governor of Falcón from 1996 to 2000. He died in Caracas on 8 January 2022, at the age of 84.

References

1937 births
2022 deaths
People from Falcón
State governors of Venezuela
Venezuelan politicians
Copei politicians
Death in Caracas
Public works ministers of Venezuela